Aphelia imperfectana is a species of moth of the family Tortricidae. It is found in Lebanon.

References

Moths described in 1859
Aphelia (moth)
Moths of the Middle East